The Margaret Formation is a geologic formation of the Eureka Sound Group in the Sverdrup Basin in Northwest Territories and Nunavut, Canada. The unit belonging to the Eureka Sound Group which crops out at Ellesmere Island preserves fossils dating back to the Early Eocene period, or Wasatchian in the NALMA classification.

The Margaret Formation comprises sandstones, sandy siltstones, clay-rich sandstones, coal seams and clay-rich coal seams and volcanic ash beds. Radiometric dating of the formation provided ages of 52.6 ± 1.9 Ma (2010) and 53.7 ± 0.6 Ma (2017).

The deltaic to swamp environment of the Margaret Formation has provided a diverse fauna of various groups of mammals, birds (Presbyornis and Gastornis), reptiles (turtles, snakes, lizards and crocodiles) and fish.

Description 
The Margaret Formation comprises sandstones, sandy siltstones, clay-rich sandstones, coal seams and clay-rich coal seams and volcanic ash beds.

The formation was probably deposited in a lush proximal delta front to delta plain environment, with abundant channels and coal swamps.

Dating 
A volcanic ash layer containing crandallite in the middle of the formation was dated using U-Pb radiometric dating in 2017 to 53.7 ± 0.6 Ma. In 2010, ashes of the formation were dated to 52.6 ± 1.9 Ma.

Arctic climate of the Early Eocene 

The fossils and sedimentology indicate a lush, rain forest community on a coastal delta plain. Multiple palaeoclimate proxies, ranging from oxygen isotope analysis of vertebrate

Despite the mild Eocene Arctic climate, the vertebrate fauna would have experienced months of total darkness and cooler temperatures during the winter. Recent isotopic work suggests that some mammals, including the hippo-like Coryphodon, were year-round residents in the High Arctic. Given that Gastornis was large (approaching
) and flightless, it likely also was a year-round resident of the Arctic. In contrast, the volant Presbyornis might have been a seasonal migrant to the Arctic.

Fossil content 

The formation has provided the following fossils:

Mammals 
Primates
 Paromomyidae indet.
Acreodi
 Pachyaena sp.
Carnivora

 Miacis sp.
 cf. Vulpavus sp.

Dermoptera
 Plagiomene sp.
Eutheria

 Palaeosinopa nunavutensis
 Anacodon sp.

Ferae

 Arcticanodon dawsonae
 Palaeonictis sp.
 Viverravus sp.

Glires

 Microparamys bayi
 Paramys hunti
 Strathcona major
 S. minor
 ?Paramyinae indet.

Hyaenodonta
 Prolimnocyon sp.
Leptictida
 Prodiacodon sp.
Multituberculata

 Ectypodus arctos
 Neoplagiaulacidae indet.

Pantodonta
 Coryphodon pisuqti
Perissodactyla

 Lambdotherium sp.
 Thuliadanta mayri
 Equidae indet.

Birds 
Anseriformes
 Presbyornis cf. pervetus
Gastornithiformes
 Gastornis sp.

Reptiles 
Turtles

 Geochelone sp.
 Cryptodira indet.
 Emydinae indet.
 Kinosterninae indet.
 Trionychidae indet.

Crocodiles
 Allognathosuchus sp.
Lizards

 Anguidae indet.
 Varanidae indet.

Snakes
 Erycidae indet.

Amphibians 
Caudata	
 Piceoerpeton willwoodense

Fish 
Teleostei
 Esox sp.
Amiiformes

 Amia fragosa
 Amia cf. uintaensis

Lepisosteiformes
 ?Lepisosteus sp.

Correlations 

The formation has been correlated with the Allenby Formation and Kamloops Group of British Columbia, the Chickaloon Formation of Alaska, and with the Wishbone, Chuckanut and Iceberg Bay Formations. The upper Margaret Formation also has been correlated with the Buchanan Lake Formation of the Eastern Arctic Archipelago.

See also 

 List of fossiliferous stratigraphic units in Northwest Territories
 List of fossiliferous stratigraphic units in Nunavut

References

Bibliography 

Geology and climate
 
 
 
 
 

Paleontology
 
 
 
 
 
 
 
 
 
 
 
 
 
 

Geologic formations of Canada
Eocene Series of North America
Paleogene Northwest Territories
Paleogene Nunavut
Ypresian Stage
Wasatchian
Sandstone formations of Canada
Siltstone formations
Coal formations
Coal in Canada
Tuff formations
Deltaic deposits
Paludal deposits
Fossiliferous stratigraphic units of North America
Paleontology in the Northwest Territories
Paleontology in Nunavut
Formations